Velký Osek is a municipality and village in Kolín District in the Central Bohemian Region of the Czech Republic. It has about 2,500 inhabitants.

Transport
Velký Osek is both road and railway hub. There is only one rail line leading off the main station: to Choceň and Prague.

References

Villages in Kolín District